The Central District of Faruj County is a district (bakhsh) in Faruj County, North Khorasan Province, Iran. At the 2006 census, its population was 33,409, in 8,781 families.  The District has one city: Faruj. The District has three rural districts (dehestan): Faruj Rural District, Sangar Rural District, and Shah Jahan Rural District.

References 

Districts of North Khorasan Province
Faruj County